Abajo may refer to:

José Luis Abajo (born 1978), Spanish fencer
Abajo Mountains, mountain range in Utah, United States
Abajo Peak, mountain in Utah, United States